The 2nd Engineer Regiment is a military engineer regiment of the Italian Army based in Trento in Trentino. Founded in 1860 it is currently the oldest engineer regiment of the Italian Army. Since 1954 it has been part of the 4th Alpine Army Corps and therefore has a strong association with the army's mountain infantry corps, the Alpini, with which the regiment shares the distinctive Cappello Alpino. Today the regiment is the engineer unit of the Alpine Brigade "Julia" and specializes in mountain combat.

History 
In 1860 the 2nd Sappers Regiment was formed in Piacenza. The regiment was formed with companies transferred from the Sappers Regiment and sappers companies from the army of the Grand Duchy of Tuscany and the army of the Royal Provinces of Emilia, which had been integrated into the Royal Sardinian Army. The regiment consisted of a staff, a depot, and three battalions, with four sappers companies per battalion. Right away the regiment's companies participated in the invasion of the Kingdom of the Two Sicilies following Giuseppe Garibaldi's Expedition of the Thousand. During the invasion the regiment's companies participated in the Siege of Gaeta. For their conduct during the siege the regiment's 3rd Sappers Company and 7th Sappers Company were each awarded a Bronze Medal of Military Valour. After the annexation of the Kingdom of the Two Sicilies the regiment provided troops for the suppression of the popular revolt in Southern Italy in 1860-70.

In 1866 the regiment participated in the Third Italian War of Independence. In 1867 the regiment was merged with the 1st Sappers Regiment to form the Sappers Corps, which had its headquarters in Casale Monferrato and consisted of 28 sappers companies. In 1870 the 1st, 2nd, 4th, 10th, and 25th sappers companies participated in the capture of Rome. On 1 January 1874 the corps was split and with the corps' staff and depot the 2nd Engineer Regiment was reformed in Casale Monferrato. The regiment received from the disbanded Sappers Corps 13 sappers companies, two Ferrovieri companies, and a train company. The regiment also received four Pontieri companies from the 1st Artillery Regiment (Pontieri), which was disbanded and used to reform the 1st Engineer Regiment.

In 1883 the regiment provided four Pontieri companies, three telegraphers companies, two Ferrovieri companies, two train companies, two sappers companies, and a Lagunari company for the formation of the 3rd Engineer Regiment and 4th Engineer Regiment. In 1895 the regiment provided six sappers companies for the formation of the 5th Engineer Regiment and dispatched 6 officers and 243 enlisted for the First Italo-Ethiopian War. On 1 November 1895 the regiment was renamed 2nd Engineer Regiment (Sappers) and consisted now of a staff, four sappers brigades, two train companies, and a depot. Each of the four brigades consisted of three sappers companies. In 1910 the brigades were renamed battalions. During the Italo-Turkish War of 1911-12 the regiment's I Battalion and II Battalion were deployed to Libya. In 1912 the regiment raised a fifth sappers battalion.

World War I 
During World War I battalions and companies raised by the regiment fought in all sectors of the Italian front. In total the regiment formed 42 sappers battalion commands and 122 sappers companies, 52 bridge sections, 31 divisional cableway sections, six firefighters sections, five cableway sections for alpine groups, one territorial militia battalion command and six territorial militia companies, and 11 army corps engineer parks.

After the war the regiment was disbanded on 31 March 1920 and its personnel used to form a sappers battalion and a telegraphers battalion for each army corps on 1 April 1920.

On 1 October 1922 the 1st Army Corps Engineer Grouping was formed in Turin, which received the Sappers Battalion and the Telegraphers Battalion of the I Army Corps, and a miners company from the disbanded Miners Engineer Regiment. Both battalions had been raised on 1 April 1920. The grouping consisted of a command, a sappers-miners battalion, a telegraphers battalion, a photo-electricians company, six dovecotes (in Turin, Cuneo, Exilles, Fenestrelle, Vinadio, and Alessandria), and a depot. In 1924 the grouping moved to Casale Monferrato. On 11 October 1926 the grouping was renamed 2nd Engineer Regiment and consisted now of a command, a sappers-miners battalion, a telegraphers battalion, a cableway battalion, a depot and six dovecotes (in Alessandria, Cuneo, Genoa, Vinadio, Tende, and Nava). In February 1928 the regiment provided troops for the formation of the 11th Engineer Regiment.

On 1 February 1931 the Cableway Battalion was reorganized as Miners-Cableway Battalion and transferred on 28 October 1932 to the newly formed 1st Miners Regiment in Novi Ligure. On the same day the regiment received the I Battalion of the disbanded 2nd Radio-Telegraphers Regiment.

For the Second Italo-Ethiopian War the regiment formed the XIV Cableway Battalion, an autonomous cableway company, a connections company, a sappers company, a mixed engineer company, a water platoon, a cableway replacements company, and two firefighting sections. In January 1937 the telegraphers and radio-telegraphers battalions were renamed connections battalions.

World War II 
With the outbreak of World War II the regiment's depot began to mobilize new units:

 Command of the 5th Engineer Grouping
 IV Mixed Engineer Battalion (for the 4th Alpine Division "Cuneense")
 LIV Mixed Engineer Battalion (for the 54th Infantry Division "Napoli")
 V Engineer Battalion
 XXVII Engineer Battalion
 V Telegraphers Battalion
 V Marconists Battalion
 and many smaller units

The 4th Alpine Division "Cuneense" and the 5th Engineer Grouping were sent in summer 1942 to the Eastern Front, where both were destroyed during Operation Little Saturn in December-January 1943. The IV Mixed Engineer Battalion of the Cuneense was awarded a Silver Medal of Military Valour for its conduct and sacrifice on the Eastern Front. The 2nd Engineer Regiment was disbanded by invading German forces after the announcement of the Armistice of Cassibile on 8 September 1943.

2nd Miners Regiment 
On 28 October 1932 the 2nd Miners Regiment was formed in Verona. The regiment consisted of a command and three miners battalions, which had been transferred from the 4th Engineer Regiment, 5th Engineer Regiment, and 11th Engineer Regiment. The regiment's command and depot were formed with personnel from the disbanded 1st Radio-Telegraphers Regiment, while the three miners battalions were transferred from the 4th Engineer Regiment, 5th Engineer Regiment, and 11th Engineer Regiment.

During World War II the regiment's depot mobilized the V, VI, VII, VIII, X, and CV miners battalions. The regiment was disbanded by invading German forces after the announcement of the Armistice of Cassibile on 8 September 1943.

Cold War 
On 20 April 1954 the 2nd Engineer Grouping was formed in Bolzano. On 1 April 1955 the grouping was renamed 2nd Engineer Regiment and assigned to the IV Alpine Army Corps. The regiment received the flag and traditions of the 2nd Engineer Regiment. The regiment consisted of the following units:

  2nd Engineer Regiment, in Bolzano
 Command Platoon, in Bolzano
 II Miners Battalion, in Bolzano
 IV Fortification Engineer Battalion, in Sterzing
 IV Engineer Battalion, in Bolzano (transferred from the 1st Engineer Regiment on 1 July 1955)
 1st Camouflage Company (transferred from the 5th Engineer Regiment on 7 May 1955)

On 16 January 1964 the IV Fortification Engineer Battalion was disbanded, while the 1st Camouflage Company and the 1st Mechanics-Electricians Company and 1st Photo-Electricians Company of the 1st Engineer Regiment were merged into a Mixed Company. On 1 March of the same year the regiment received from the disbanded 1st Engineer Regiment the VII Engineer Battalion in Riva del Garda, the XIV Army Corps Engineer Battalion in Trento, the 1st Cableway Company in Trento, and the Mixed Company in Trento.

In 1974 the 1st Cableway Company and the Mixed Photoelectric-Camouflage Company were disbanded. In preparation for the 1975 army reform the IV Engineer Battalion and VII Engineer Battalion were disbanded on 28 May 1975. During this reform the Italian Army disbanded the regimental level and newly independent battalions were granted for the first time their own flags. During the reform engineer battalions were named for a lake if they supported a corps or named for a river if they supported a division or brigade. On 6 November 1975 the 2nd Engineer Regiment was disbanded and the regiment's II Miners Battalion was renamed 2nd Mining Engineer Battalion "Iseo" and assigned the flag and traditions of the 2nd Engineer Regiment and the traditions of the 2nd Miners Regiment, while the XIV Army Corps Engineer Battalion was renamed 4th Engineer Battalion "Orta" and assigned the flag and traditions of the 4th Engineer Regiment. Both battalions were assigned to the 4th Alpine Army Corps' Engineer Command and consisted of a command, a command and park company, and three engineer respectively three mining engineer companies. On 22 January 1976 the battalion received the Cappello Alpino.

For its conduct and work after the 1976 Friuli earthquake the battalion was awarded a Bronze Medal of Army Valour, which was affixed to the battalion's flag.

In 1986 the battalion was renamed 2nd Sappers Battalion "Iseo" and now consisted of a command, a command and services company, three sappers companies, and a special equipment company.

Recent times 
On 13 October 1995 the 2nd Engineer Regiment was reformed in the city of Trento by renaming the 1st Engineer Regiment, which had been formed on 4 October 1993 with the personnel and materiel of the 4th Engineer Battalion "Orta". The same day the Orta was renamed "Iseo" and the flag assigned to the Orta was transferred to Palermo, where it was returned to the 4th Engineer Regiment. In 2002 the regiment was transferred from the Alpine Troops Command to the Alpine Brigade "Julia".

Current structure 
As of 2022 the 2nd Engineer Regiment consists of:

  Regimental Command, in Trento
  10th Command and Logistic Support Company "Tuono"
  XXXI Sappers Battalion "Iseo"
  3rd Sappers Company "Gaeta"
  5th Sappers Company "Audace"
  7th Sappers Company "Tigre"
  124th Deployment Support Company "Lupi"

The Command and Logistic Support Company fields the following platoons: C3 Platoon, Transport and Materiel Platoon, Medical Platoon, Commissariat Platoon, and EOD Platoon. Each of the two sapper companies fields a Command Platoon, an Advanced Combat Reconnaissance Teams Platoon, and two sapper platoons. The Deployment Support Company and Mobility Support Company field the battalion's heavy military engineering vehicles: Biber bridgelayers, Dachs armored engineer vehicles, cranes, excavators, Medium Girder Bridges etc. The sapper companies and Command and Logistic Support Company are equipped with VTLM "Lince" and VTMM "Orso" vehicles.

See also 
 Alpine Brigade "Julia"

External links
Italian Army Website: 2° Reggimento Genio Guastatori

References

Alpini regiments of Italy
Regiments of Italy in World War I
Regiments of Italy in World War II
Engineer Regiments of Italy
Military units and formations established in 1860